"Baby Make It Soon" is a 1969 song by The Marmalade.  It was written by Tony Macaulay.  The song reached number nine in the UK and number 3 in South Africa.

Chart history

Weekly charts

Year-end charts

The Flying Machine cover
"Baby Make It Soon" was covered by The Flying Machine in 1970.  It charted in the US, reaching number 87.

Chart history

References

External links
  
 

1969 songs
1969 singles
1970 singles
Songs written by Tony Macaulay
CBS Records singles
Marmalade (band) songs
1960s ballads
British songs